Drake Stadium may refer to:
 Drake Stadium (1904), a defunct outdoor multiuse sports field at Drake University used from 1904 to 1925
 Drake Stadium (Drake University), an outdoor multiuse sports field at Drake University used from 1925 to present
 Drake Stadium (UCLA), an outdoor multiuse sports field at UCLA

See also
 Drake Field (stadium), a defunct outdoor sports stadium on the campus of Auburn University